Percy Creek is a stream in the western part of Sudbury District in Northeastern Ontario, Canada. It is in the Great Lakes Basin and is a right tributary of the Batchawana River.

Course
Percy Creek begins at an unnamed lake in geographic Moggy Township and flows southwest to the northeast side of Percy Lake. It drains the lake at the west and continues in a southwest direction, passes into geographic Moen Township, and reaches its mouth at the Batchawana River. The Batchawana River flows to Lake Superior.

See also
List of rivers of Ontario

References

Rivers of Sudbury District